Chris Shephard is an English footballer, who plays as a midfielder for Tiverton Town.

Career
Shephard made his début for Exeter City, coming on as a substitute in the 89th minute, at home to Grimsby Town, in the 0–0 League Two draw on 18 October 2008. He was loaned to Salisbury City in the 2009–10 season. Shephard rejoined Salisbury City on a month-long loan deal in February 2011. He scored twice in a 4–1 win against Banbury United.

He scored his first professional goal for Exeter on 9 August 2011, against Yeovil Town in a 2–0 victory in the League Cup. In May 2012, Shephard was released by Exeter after the club was relegated from Football League One.

Shephard signed for Eastbourne Borough on 30 July 2012.

On 8 June 2019, he signed for Tiverton Town.

References

External links
Chris Shephard player profile at exetercityfc.co.uk

Living people
English footballers
Exeter City F.C. players
Salisbury City F.C. players
Bath City F.C. players
Eastbourne Borough F.C. players
English Football League players
National League (English football) players
1988 births
Weymouth F.C. players
Tiverton Town F.C. players
Association football midfielders